The Health Professions Scholarship Program (HPSP) offers prospective military physicians (M.D. or D.O.), dentists, nurses, optometrists, psychologists, pharmacists, and veterinarians a paid medical education in exchange for service as a commissioned medical department officer. Programs are  available in the United States Army, the United States Navy, and the United States Air Force.

Created under authority of the Uniformed Services Health Professions Revitalization Act of 1972, the HPSP is the primary source of trained healthcare professionals entering the United States Armed Forces.  Subject to  eligibility for a commission (such as US citizenship, physical and academic qualifications, etc.), scholarship "selectees" are commissioned as second lieutenants in the US Army Reserve or the US Air Force Reserve, or ensigns in the US Navy Reserve. The selectees are then placed on inactive reserve status during their medical training.

Prospective students compete for scholarships that cover some or all of the medical school years. The Air Force offers one- to four-year scholarships, the Army offers one- to four-year scholarships and the Navy offers three to four year scholarships. While on scholarship, the financial expenses of tuition, certain academic fees, a monthly stipend, mandatory books and equipment, and a laptop rental are paid by the student's sponsoring service.

As inactive reserve officers, the students are required to serve 45 days of active duty for training (ADT) each fiscal year.  While on active duty, they receive the same rights, privileges, and pay, and are subject to the Uniform Code of Military Justice, as any other active-duty officer. For the first two years of training, this duty is sometimes spent attending an officer basic course/school (Army, Navy, Air Force) or executing "School Orders" (participating in clinical training) at the student's university. For the 3rd and 4th years, the student will often carry out elective clinical rotations at a military hospital.  Time spent in HPSP may count towards the 20 years required for a reserve retirement if the member participates in the selected reserve after separating from active duty, and is credited back on a one-for-one selected reserve / HPSP year basis.  No HPSP time (active duty or not) counts towards an active duty 20-year retirement.

Upon graduation, the students are promoted to the rank of captain in the Army and Air Force, or lieutenant in the Navy, and medical school graduates may be placed on active duty if matched for residency in a military or civilian hospital, while clinical psychology doctoral students have a similar arrangement for their one-year internship.

In general, Army and Air Force medical residents are allowed to complete their residencies before proceeding to their first assignments, while Navy personnel complete an internship and then serve as a general medical officer (GMO), with the option of completing a residency following their GMO tour. Student must apply to military residencies and must accept these positions if they are offered. While wages for military residents are higher than for civilian, a military residency requires the student to fulfill further service obligations, which are paid back concurrently with the obligation from medical school.

The incurred service obligation is generally one-for-one for every service-paid year of schooling, with a minimum of two years for physicians and three years for other specialties. Additional time required for certain postgraduate programs, such as lengthy residencies, can result in longer service obligations. Fulfillment of the obligation begins only after postgraduate training is completed.  For Navy officers, time spent as a GMO is credited towards the service obligation. However, physicians that serve time as a GMO or flight surgeon prior to residency (after internship) will incur additional commitment of one-for-one if they complete subsequent residency training.  This usually results in a longer service commitment than if they entered residency directly (example: 4 year medical commitment - 3 year GMO tour + 4-year residency = 7 year total commitment versus only 4 years if residency was entered directly).  It is important to note that longer initial commitments have a significant negative financial impact; medical officers may take certain multi-year bonuses (which may equal up to 40% of total pay) which will run consecutive with initial residency and certain other commitments, resulting in substantial lost income if residency commitment payback is delayed due to GMO/flight medicine tour or sponsored fellowship/residency.

HPSP opportunities are not offered by the United States Marine Corps, since it receives its medical services from the U.S. Navy.

Notes

External links
 Air Force
 Army
 Navy
 Forum discussing HPSP
 HPSP scholarship blog for current and prospective students from all branches

Medical education in the United States
Government scholarships
Military education and training in the United States
Scholarships in the United States